In number theory, a number field F is called totally real if for each embedding of F into the complex numbers the image lies inside the real numbers. Equivalent conditions are that F is generated over Q by one root of an integer polynomial P, all of the roots of P being real; or that the tensor product algebra of F with the real field, over Q, is isomorphic to a tensor power of R.

For example, quadratic fields F of degree 2 over Q are either real (and then totally real), or complex, depending on whether the square root of a positive or negative number is adjoined to Q. In the case of cubic fields, a cubic integer polynomial P irreducible over Q will have at least one real root. If it has one real and two complex roots the corresponding cubic extension of Q defined by adjoining the real root will not be totally real, although it is a field of real numbers.

The totally real number fields play a significant special role in algebraic number theory. An abelian extension of Q is either totally real, or contains a totally real subfield over which it has degree two.

Any number field that is Galois over the rationals must be either totally real or totally imaginary.

See also
Totally imaginary number field
CM-field, a totally imaginary quadratic extension of a totally real field

References

Field (mathematics)
Algebraic number theory